Jind Jaan is a 2019 Punjabi film starring Rajvir Jawanda and Sara Sharmaa. It tells the story of a Mama (Jaswinder Bhalla) and Ranjha who is his Bhanja (Rajvir Jwanda) who together travel to Thailand on a special mission. While in Thailand they meet a manager (Harby Sangha) of a very rich family, who introduces the duo to the family of Bhuji (Upasna Singh) and Juliet (Sara Sharmaa). While on their secret mission, Ranjha falls in love with Juliet and in comes the villain (Gaurav Kakkar) and a dangerous Don (Swatantra Bharat) The film was released on 14 June 2019.

Cast
 Rajvir Jwanda as Ranjha
 Sara Sharmaa as Juliet
 Jaswinder Bhalla as Mama
 Harby Sangha as Manager
 Swatantra Bharat as Tiger
 Upasana Singh as Bhuaa
 Guggu Gill as Friendly appearance

References

External links
 
 

2019 films
Punjabi-language Indian films
2010s Punjabi-language films